Michael Paul Swistowicz (April 22, 1927 – November 24, 1973) was an American football player who played one season in the National Football League with the New York Yanks and Chicago Cardinals. He was drafted by the New York Yanks in the fifth round of the 1950 NFL Draft. He played college football at the University of Notre Dame and attended Tilden High School in Chicago Illinois. Swistowicz died  in 1973 after working out.

References

External links
Just Sports Stats
College stats

1927 births
1973 deaths
Players of American football from Chicago
American football running backs
American football defensive backs
Notre Dame Fighting Irish football players
New York Yanks players
Chicago Cardinals players